Milionia exultans is a moth of the family Geometridae first described by Rothschild in 1926.

References

Boarmiini